The Chepelare (Chepelarska reka, also called Chaya, Чая and Asenitsa, Асеница) is a river in Bulgaria that takes its source from Rozhen Peak (around 1,500 m above sea level) in the Rhodopes. The river's length is about 82 km and two hydroelectric plants are constructed on it, with a total maximum power of 2,400 kW.

The Chepelare runs through the town of Chepelare, the Bachkovo Monastery, as well as the second largest city of Plovdiv Province, Asenovgrad, further downstream, before emptying into the Maritsa.

References

Rivers of Bulgaria
Rhodope Mountains
Landforms of Smolyan Province
Landforms of Plovdiv Province